The FC Basel 1910–11 season was their eighteenth season since the club's foundation. The club's chairman was Ernst-Alfred Thalmann, it was his ninth presidential term, his third term in succession. FC Basel played their home games in the Landhof.

Overview 
By the 1 January 1911 there were 63 clubs with 7157 members that were organized in the Swiss Football Association.

Emil Hasler was team captain for the third consequtive season and as captain he led the team trainings and was responsible for the line-ups. During the 1910–11 season Basel played a total of 38 matches, 23 friendly games, 12 in the domestic league and three games in the Anglo-Cup. Of the 23 friendlies Basel won eleven, drawing three and they were defeated nine times. In the pre-season Basel travelled to Germany once, to play a 4–3 victory against Freiburger FC. The other pre-seasons were played against Swiss teams.

During the winter break the team again travelled north and played a 2–2 draw against the Würzburger Kickers on Christmas day and on boxing day a 5–0 win against Ludwigshafener FG 1903. In January the team travelled to France and played a 5–0 win against Mulhouse. In March they travelled to Germany and travelled home with a 1–6 defeat after their game with Mannheimer FG 1896. At the end of season they travelled to Germany once more. On Easter Sunday they lost 2–4 against FV 1900 Kaiserslautern and on Easter Monday 0–1 against Mannheimer FC Phönix 02. One week later the team came home after a 1–5 defeat against Freiburger FC and yet another week later after a 2–3 defeat against Strassburger FV. 

Basel also played hosts to two British teams. They lost at home in the Landhof 1–7 against Newcastle United and 1–5 against Celtic. All together ten games were played abroad and five other away games were played in Switzerland against Swiss teams. Eight of the friendlies were played at home, four of the guest teams came from abroad, three guest teams came from clubs in Switzerland.

The other friendly match was played against the Switzerland national football team on Sunday 26 February 1911. The national time line up was: Von Gunten; Adamina, Müller; Leuner, Rubli I, Ehrbar; Collet, Rubli II, Wyss, Kaiser, Weiss. Basel played with a strengthened team in following line up: Flückiger (Aarau); Moll, Wenger; Albicker II, Hartmann (Biel), Albicker I; Wunderle, Renand (Servette), Kaltenbach, Hasler, Eugen Strauss (La Chaux-de-Fonds). Team Basel won the game 3–0 thanks to two goals from Renand and one from Stauss.

The Swiss Serie A 1910–11 was again divided into three regional groups. Basel were allocated to the Central group together with local rivals Old Boys. The other teams playing in the Central group were Biel-Bienne, FC Bern, Young Boys and Stella Fribourg. The Young Boys won the group and continued to the finals and eventually won the championship. Three other local teams Nordstern Basel, Concordia Basel and FC Liestal played in the Swiss Serie B, together with Basel's reserve team.

In the Anglo-Cup Basel were drawn against two of these lower classed locals. In the round of 32 away against FC Liestal, which ended with a 7–1 victory and in the round of 16 against Concordia, in which Basel ended victors 2–0. In the Quarterfinals Basel were drawn away from home against Young Boys Bern. This game ended with a 2–8 defeat. Young Boys went on to win the final against Servette.

Players 
Squad members

Results 

Legend

Friendly matches

Pre- and mid-season

Winter break to end of season

Serie A

Central group results

Central group league table

Anglo-Cup

See also
 History of FC Basel
 List of FC Basel players
 List of FC Basel seasons

Notes

Footnotes

Incomplete league matches 1910–11 season: Aarau-FCB, FCB-YB, Stella-FCB, FCB-Biel, FCB-Aarau, YB-FCB, FCB-Stella, OB-FCB, Bern-FCB and Biel-FCB

References

Sources  
 Rotblau: Jahrbuch Saison 2014/2015. Publisher: FC Basel Marketing AG. 
 Die ersten 125 Jahre. Publisher: Josef Zindel im Friedrich Reinhardt Verlag, Basel. 
 FC Basel team 1910-11 at fcb-archiv.ch
 Switzerland 1910-11 at RSSSF

External links
 FC Basel official site

FC Basel seasons
Basel